Rabbi Shlomo Halberstam (1908 —  August 2, 2000), was the third Rebbe of Bobov who re-established the Hasidic dynasty in the United States after World War II. Born in Poland, he was the oldest son of Rabbi Ben Zion Halberstam (1874–1941) of Bobov, who was murdered by the Nazis and their Russian collaborators in the Holocaust.

Rebuilding
Starting off with a small yeshiva for sixteen boys in the West Side of Manhattan, Grand Rebbe Shlomo Halberstam rebuilt the Bobov institutions in America, Israel and in London after the Holocaust. He also rebuilt in another way: he remarried, having lost his first wife and most of their children during the Holocaust. 

Grand Rebbe Shlomo Halberstam died in the summer of 2000, and was succeeded by his oldest son, Rabbi Naftali Halberstam (1931–2005).

Legacy
Divrei Shlomo and 
a selection of his teachings were recorded in the book Kerem Shlome.

Rebbes of Bobov
 Rabbi Shlomo Halberstam (1847–1905) grandson of the Sanzer Rebbe, Chaim Halberstam
 Rabbi Ben Zion Halberstam (1874–1941)
 Rabbi Shlomo Halberstam (1907–2000)
 Rabbi Naftali Halberstam (1931–2005) older son of Rabbi Shlomo Halberstam 
 Rabbi Benzion Aryeh Leibish Halberstam, younger son of Rabbi Shlomo Halberstam

See also
Chaim Halberstam
Bobowa (in Poland)
Borough Park, Brooklyn

References

External links
A video clip of Rabbi Solomon Halberstam
A Video Clip of Rabbi Solomon Halberstam dancing at his great-granddaughter's wedding

1908 births
2000 deaths

Rebbes of Bobov
American Hasidic rabbis
Polish Hasidic rabbis
Hasidic rabbis in Europe
Holocaust survivors
Rabbis from New York (state)
People from Borough Park, Brooklyn
Descendants of the Baal Shem Tov